The 133rd Indiana Infantry Regiment served in the Union Army between May 17 and September 5, 1864, during the American Civil War.

Service 
The regiment was organized at Indianapolis, Indiana and mustered in on May 17, 1864. It was ordered to Tennessee and assigned duty at Bridgeport, Alabama as well as railroad guard duty, until early September 1864. The regiment was mustered out on September 5, 1864. During its service the regiment lost seventeen men to disease.

See also
 List of Indiana Civil War regiments

References

Bibliography 
 Dyer, Frederick H. (1959). A Compendium of the War of the Rebellion. New York and London. Thomas Yoseloff, Publisher. .

Units and formations of the Union Army from Indiana
Military units and formations established in 1864
1864 establishments in Indiana
Military units and formations disestablished in 1864
1864 disestablishments in Indiana